Battle Sluts is the second album by American heavy metal band Destroy Destroy Destroy.

Track listing

Personnel 
Destroy Destroy Destroy
 Bryan Kemp — lead vocals
 Jeremiah Scott — guitar, backing vocals
 Way Barrier — guitar, backing vocals
 Adam Phillips — bass, backing vocals
 Brian Shorter — keyboards, backing vocals
 Andrew Core — drums

Production
 Chris Dauphin — orchestration
 Hunter Camp — backing vocals
 Mike Mosier — backing vocals
 Brad Hartley — backing vocal
 Jessie "Danza" Freeland (The Tony Danza Tapdance Extravaganza) — guest vocals on "Agents of  Hypocrisy"

References

2009 albums
Destroy Destroy Destroy albums
Black Market Activities albums